Thruston Ballard Morton (August 19, 1907 – August 14, 1982) was an American politician. A Republican, Morton represented Kentucky in the U.S. House of Representatives and the U.S. Senate.

Early life 
Morton was born on August 19, 1907, in Louisville, Kentucky, to David Morton and his wife, Mary Ballard, descended from pioneer settlers of the area. He had a brother, Rogers Clark Ballard Morton, who also became a politician, and a sister, Jane, who survived him. He attended local public schools and the Woodberry Forest School, before he entered Yale University. He received a B.A. there in 1929.

Morton then worked in the family business, Ballard & Ballard Flour Milling, becoming its chairman of the board before the company was sold to the Pillsbury Company.

A lifelong Episcopalian, he married Belle Clay Lyons and was survived by their two sons, Clay Lyons Morton and Thruston Ballard Morton, Jr., and five grandchildren.

His brother, Rogers Clark Ballard Morton, represented Maryland in the U.S. House of Representatives from 1963 through 1971. The Morton brothers served together in the U.S. Congress from 1963 to 1968, with Thruston as a U.S. Senator representing Kentucky and Rogers as a U.S. Representative representing Maryland. Both brothers also served as chair of the Republican National Committee.

Rogers Morton subsequently became U.S. Secretary of the Interior in the administration of Presidents Richard Nixon and Gerald Ford, and then became U.S. Secretary of Commerce under Ford, before chairing Ford's re-election campaign in 1976.

Political career

U.S. House of Representatives 
After naval service in World War II, Morton defeated the 12-year Democratic incumbent, Rep. Emmet O'Neal, in the 1946 election in his native Louisville area (Kentucky's 3rd congressional district), 61,899 votes to 44,599 votes. Having been re-elected in 1948 and 1950, Morton served three terms in the House, from January 3, 1947, to January 3, 1953.

U.S. Assistant Secretary of State 
Morton did not seek re-election in 1952. After leaving the House, Morton was appointed as U.S. Assistant Secretary of State for Congressional Relations in the administration of President Dwight D. Eisenhower, garnering legislators' support for Eisenhower's foreign policy.

U.S. Senate 
In 1956, Morton, by a very narrow margin, defeated the Democratic incumbent, Sen. Earle Clements from Kentucky, a former governor of Kentucky and then-minority whip in the U.S. Senate, by 506,903 votes to 499,922. Morton was re-elected to a second term in the U.S. Senate in 1962, defeating the Democratic lieutenant governor and former mayor of Louisville, Wilson W. Wyatt.

Morton served from January 3, 1957, until his resignation, on December 16, 1968. He vacated the seat a few weeks early to allow his successor, Marlow Cook, a fellow Republican with similar views, to gain an edge in seniority.

In the Senate, Morton was considered a moderate and voted, along with his Republican colleague, Sen. John Sherman Cooper from Kentucky and most other Republicans, for the Civil Rights Acts of 1957, 1960, 1964, and 1968, as well as the 24th Amendment to the U.S. Constitution, the Voting Rights Act of 1965, and the confirmation of Thurgood Marshall to the U.S. Supreme Court. A compromise that Morton proposed to guarantee jury trials in all criminal contempt cases except for voting rights proved, with the assistance of Sens. Everett Dirksen from Illinois and Bourke Hickenlooper from Iowa, crucial in passing that Civil Rights Act.

Morton was the chair of the Republican National Committee from 1959 to 1961 and chaired the Republican National Convention of 1964.

When Morton retired, he surprised many, who considered him at the peak of his political power. However, he opposed the Vietnam War despite being criticized by Rep. William Cowger from Kentucky. Also, he was both depressed by the urban violence after the April 1968 assassination of Martin Luther King Jr. and that of Robert F. Kennedy a few weeks later, and disappointed in his party's failure to address the broader social issues. He also ultimately counseled then-President Lyndon Johnson to decline to seek re-election, and he supported the unsuccessful presidential candidacy of Gov. Nelson Rockefeller of New York.

Morton is interviewed in the 1968 documentary film In the Year of the Pig, and another interview is available through the Lyndon Baines Johnson Presidential Library.

Later life 
After his retirement from the U.S. Senate, Morton served as vice chairman of Liberty National Bank in Louisville, president of the American Horse Council, and chairman of the board of Churchill Downs, and he served as one of the directors of the University of Louisville, Pillsbury Company, Pittston Company, Louisville Board of Trade, Texas Gas Company, R.J. Reynolds Company, and the Ohio Valley Assembly.

Morton died after many years of declining health. His brother Rogers Morton had died three years previously, and his wife, Belle, survived him by more than a decade. He was interred at Cave Hill Cemetery in Louisville.

Legacy 
His papers are held by Louisville's Filson Historical Society, which his grandfather had revitalized. The Kentucky Digital Library has a collection of his speeches.

References

External links

Guide to the Thruston B Morton papers, housed at the University of Kentucky Libraries Special Collections Research Center

|-

|-

|-

|-

|-

1907 births
1982 deaths
20th-century American politicians
Burials at Cave Hill Cemetery
Politicians from Louisville, Kentucky
Republican National Committee chairs
Republican Party members of the United States House of Representatives from Kentucky
Republican Party United States senators from Kentucky
United States Assistant Secretaries of State
Woodberry Forest School alumni
Yale University alumni
20th-century American Episcopalians